Stoystown Historic District is a national historic district located at Stoystown in Somerset County, Pennsylvania. The district includes 81 contributing buildings, two contributing sites, and one contributing object. It encompasses central business district and surrounding residential areas in Stoystown. They primarily date from the late-19th and early-20th century. Notable non-residential buildings include the Grace Lutheran Church (1888), St. Paul's United Church of Christ (1897), John Griffin Building (c. 1880), Laurel Bank (1922), former Custer House (c. 1830/1870), H.J. Specht Hardware (c. 1920), former IOOF Hall (c. 1900), and former public school (1929). The contributing sites are the Union Cemetery (c. 1796) and Stoystown-Quemahoning Township Area Recreation Park (c. 1930).  The contributing object is a Lincoln Highway marker (1928).  Located in the district and separately listed is the Hite House, dated to 1853.

It was listed on the National Register of Historic Places in 2001.

References 

Historic districts on the National Register of Historic Places in Pennsylvania
Queen Anne architecture in Pennsylvania
Historic districts in Somerset County, Pennsylvania
National Register of Historic Places in Somerset County, Pennsylvania